Trigger Tricks is a 1930 American pre-Code Western film written and directed by B. Reeves Eason, and starring Hoot Gibson, Sally Eilers, Robert Homans, Jack Richardson, Monte Montague and Neal Hart. It was released on June 8, 1930, by Universal Pictures.

Cast 
Hoot Gibson as Texas Ranger Tim Brennan
Sally Eilers as Betty Dawley
Robert Homans as Thomas Kingston 
Jack Richardson as Joe Dixon
Monte Montague as Nick Dalgus 
Neal Hart as Sheriff Jack Thompson
Max Asher as Ike
Walter Perry as Mike

Plot
A cattleman (Gibson) works as a gunman for a group of cattlemen while he tries to find out who killed his brother. Along the way, he falls in love with the owner (Eilers) of a sheep ranch and learns the killer's identity.

References

External links 
 

1930 films
American Western (genre) films
1930 Western (genre) films
Universal Pictures films
Films directed by B. Reeves Eason
American black-and-white films
1930s English-language films
1930s American films